Éilís Ní Dhuibhne (born 22 February 1954), also known as Eilis Almquist and Elizabeth O'Hara, is an Irish novelist and short story writer who writes both in Irish and English. She has been shortlisted for the Orange Prize for Fiction, and is a recipient of the Irish PEN Award.

Biography
Ní Dhuibhne was born in Dublin in 1954. She attended University College Dublin (UCD), where she studied Pure English for her BA, did an M Phil in Middle English and Old Irish, and finished in 1982 with a PhD in Folklore  She was awarded the UCD Entrance scholarship for English, and two post graduate scholarships in Folklore. In 1978-9 she studied at the Folklore Institute in the University of Copenhagen while researching her doctoral thesis, and in 1982 was awarded a PhD from the National University of Ireland (NUI). About her time in Denmark, Ní Dhuibhne states that she "kind of discovered feminism there", because it "was more liberal and advanced politically and in terms of feminism". She has worked in the Department of Irish Folklore in UCD, and for many years as a curator in the National Library of Ireland. Also a teacher of Creative Writing, she has been Writer Fellow at Trinity College Dublin and is currently Writer Fellow at UCD. She is a member of Aosdána since 2004, an ambassador for the Irish Writers' Centre, and President of the Folklore of Ireland Society (An Cumann le Béaloideas Éireann). Ní Dhuibhne is the Burns Visiting Scholar at Boston College for the fall 2020 semester.

Ní Dhuibhne was married to the Swedish folklorist Bo Almqvist for 30 years until he died suddenly due to a short illness in 2013. She has two children: Ragnar and Olaf. Éilís Ní Dhuibne wrote the memoir Twelve Thousand Days: A Memoir of Love and Loss about her and her late husband's time together, named after the number of days they were married.

Further information on Éilís Ní Dhuibhne's work may be found in Rebecca Pelan, ed, Éilís Ní Dhuibhne: Perspectives. Galway, Arlen House, 2009.

Awards
 1985 Listowel Poetry Award
  Oireachtas Awards for a play and novels
  Butler Prose Award (American Association of Irish Studies)
  Bisto Merit Awards for The Hiring Fair and Hurlamaboc, and Bisto Book of the Year Award for Blaeberry Sunday
 1986 Arts Council Bursaries
 1998 Arts Council Bursaries 
 1997 BBC Irish Language Award 
 2000 Orange Prize for Fiction, shortlisted for The Dancers Dancing
2014 Hennessy Literature Award
 2015 Irish PEN Award
 2019 BBC Irish Language Award

List of works
Novels in English
 The Bray House (1990)
 Singles (1994)
 The Dancers Dancing (1999)
 Fox, Swallow, Scarecrow (2007)
Sister Caravaggio (2014)

Novels in Irish
 Dúnmharú sa Daingean (2001)
 Cailíní Beaga Ghleann na mBláth (2003)
 Hurlamaboc (2005)
 Dún an Airgid (2008)
 Dordán (2011)
Aisling Nó Iníon A (2015)

Collections
 Blood and Water (1988)
 Eating Women Is Not Recommended (1991)
 The Inland Ice (1997)
 The Pale Gold of Alaska (2000)
 Midwife to the Fairies (2003)
 The Shelter of Neighbours (2012)
 Little Red and Other Stories (2020)
 
Children's Books
 The Uncommon Cormorant (1990)
 Hugo and the Sunshine Girl (1991)
 The Hiring Fair (1992)
 Blaeberry Sunday (1993)
 Penny Farthing Sally (1996)
 The Sparkling Rain (2004)
 Snobs, Dogs and Scobies (2011)

Plays
 Dún na mBan Trí Thine  Produced by Amharclann de hÍde and first performed at the Peacock, Dublin, 1995;
 Milseog an tSamhraidh  Produced by Amharclann de hÍde and first performed at the Samuel Beckett Theatre, Trinity College, in 1996;
 The Nettle Shirts  Produced by the Abbey and performed at the Peacock Theatre, Dublin, in 1998.

Memoirs

 Twelve Thousand Days: A Memoir of Love and Loss (2018)

References

External links

Irish Authors
UCD page

1954 births
20th-century Irish women writers
21st-century Irish women writers
Living people
Alumni of University College Dublin
Aosdána members
Fellows of Trinity College Dublin
Irish women novelists
Academics of University College Dublin
University of Copenhagen alumni
Irish-language writers
Irish PEN Award for Literature winners